Abdulaziz Al-Abduassalam is a Saudi Arabian football player as a defender.

External links

Abdulaziz Al-Abduassalam at slstat.com

Year of birth missing (living people)
Living people
Saudi Arabian footballers
Al Hilal SFC players
Al-Riyadh SC players
Abha Club players
Al-Shoulla FC players
Sdoos Club players
Saudi First Division League players
Saudi Professional League players
Saudi Second Division players
Association football defenders